Newhaven Seaplane Base is today the derelict site of an experimental seaplane base at the head of the beach east of Newhaven Harbour, seaward of Tide Mills, East Sussex, England

History

The first formation of No. 242 Squadron RAF was on 15 August 1918 from numbers 408, 409 and 514 Flights at the seaplane station at Newhaven, Sussex. Operating from there and the nearby airfield at Telscombe Cliffs, it was equipped with Short Type 184 seaplanes and carried out anti-submarine patrols over the English Channel until the end of the First World War.

Description of derelict site

Surveys carried out in 2006 have exposed part of the slipway, concrete aprons to both hangars with door tracks and several other slabs presumed to be workshops.  Sussex Archaeological Society started a dig in April 2006 to catalogue the entire East Beach site

See also

 List of seaplanes and flying boats – United Kingdom
 Seaplane bases in the United Kingdom

External links
 Friends of The Tidemills and Newhaven Eastside Conservation Group

Archaeological sites in East Sussex
Royal Naval Air Stations in England
History of East Sussex
Seaplane bases in the United Kingdom
Seaplane bases in England
Defunct airports in England